Germany competed at the 2008 Summer Olympics in Beijing, People's Republic of China. A total of 439 athletes were nominated to participate in the Games. The German Olympic Sports Confederation (DOSB) nominated athletes on 29 May, 23 June and 15 July 2008.
Reaching the qualification standard set by the relevant sport's international governing body did not automatically mean that the athlete was nominated for Beijing, as the DOSB had stricter qualification standards. An athlete needed to have a somewhat realistic chance for a top 12 position. An exception to this are the team events, as the number of competing teams is already very limited through the IOC standards, and a chance for a respective place is already given by the qualification.

Medalists

Archery

Athletics

Men
Track & road events

Field events

Combined events – Decathlon

Women
Track & road events

Field events

Combined events – Heptathlon

* The athlete who finished in second place, Lyudmila Blonska of the Ukraine, tested positive for a banned substance. Both the A and the B tests were positive, therefore Blonska was stripped of her silver medal, and all German heptathletes moved up a position.

Badminton

Basketball

Men's tournament
Roster

Group play

Boxing

Canoeing

Slalom

Sprint
Men

Women

Qualification Legend: QS = Qualify to semi-final; QF = Qualify directly to final

Cycling

Road
Men

Women

Track
Sprint

Pursuit

Keirin

Omnium

Mountain biking
Men

Diving

Men

Women

Equestrian

Dressage

After the Grand Prix, the score of each individual rider is cleared, meaning only the scores of the Grand Prix Special and the Grand Prix Freestyle add up to the final score and are relevant for the rank of a rider in the individual competition. Only the 15 best riders of the Grand Prix Special advance to the Freestyle.

Eventing

# - Indicates that points do not count in team total
Only a certain number of individual riders are allowed to advance to the final and of one nation, maximal three individual riders can advance. The riders who did not advance to the individual final are ranked after all of the riders who did, their final rank being determined by their total penalties gained in the competition up to that point (dressage, cross-country and jumping qualifier).

Show jumping

Fencing

Men

Women

Field hockey

Men's tournament

Roster

Group play

Semifinal

Gold medal match

Women's tournament

Roster

Group play

Semifinal

Bronze medal match

Football

Women's tournament

Roster

Group play

Quarterfinals

Semifinals

Bronze medal game

Final rank

Gymnastics

Artistic
Men
Team

Individual finals

Women
Team

Individual finals

Trampoline

Handball

Men's tournament

Roster

Group play

Women's tournament

Roster

Group play

Judo

Men

Women

Modern pentathlon

Rowing

Men

Women

Qualification Legend: FA=Final A (medal); FB=Final B (non-medal); FC=Final C (non-medal); FD=Final D (non-medal); FE=Final E (non-medal); FF=Final F (non-medal); SA/B=Semifinals A/B; SC/D=Semifinals C/D; SE/F=Semifinals E/F; QF=Quarterfinals; R=Repechage

Sailing

Men

Women

Open

M = Medal race; EL = Eliminated – did not advance into the medal race; CAN = Race cancelled

Shooting

Men

Women

Swimming

Men

Women

Table tennis

Singles

Team

Taekwondo

Tennis

Triathlon

Volleyball

Beach

Indoor
Germany entered a team in the men's tournament. The team lost all games but one in the group play, and did not advance, finishing tied for 9th place.

Men's tournament

Roster

Group play

Water polo

Germany participated in the men's tournament, where the team finished in 10th place.

Men's tournament
Roster

Group play

All times are China Standard Time (UTC+8).

Classification semi-final

Classification 9th–10th

Weightlifting

Wrestling

Men's freestyle

Men's Greco-Roman

Women's freestyle

See also
 Germany at the 2008 Summer Paralympics

External links
DOSB Qualification criteria (in German)

References

Nations at the 2008 Summer Olympics
2008
Summer Olympics